United States Artists (USA) is a national arts funding organization based in Chicago. USA is dedicated to supporting living artists and cultural practitioners across the United States by granting unrestricted awards.

Mission 
The organization's stated mission is "Believe in Artists". In addition, the organization asserts that "USA Fellowships honor and award an artist's unique vision as a whole rather than funding a particular project. Artists at different career levels, from emerging to established, are eligible."

Awards

Berresford Prize 
Established in 2019, The Berresford Prize is an unrestricted $25,000 award given annually to a cultural practitioner who has contributed significantly to the advancement, well-being, and care of artists in society.

USA Fellowships 

USA Fellowships are annual $50,000 unrestricted awards recognizing the most compelling artists working and living in the United States at every stage of their career. Grants are awarded annually to artists working in ten disciplines:

Architecture & Design
Craft
Dance
Film
Media
Music
Theater & Performance
Traditional Arts
Visual Art
Writing

Selection process 
Every year, a geographically diverse group of nominators consist of scholars, critics, arts administrators, producers, curators, artists, field experts, and other cultural professionals are asked to nominate those they think deserve the USA fellowship. Then, the nominees are invited to submit applications with work samples, which are reviewed by a selected groups of discipline-specific panels composed of artists, curators, historians, experts, academics, and producers. After the panels select the finalists, the Board of Trustees go over the finalists together and approve.

Programs

Assembly 
Every year, USA invites each year's class of awardees to connect them with their donors, stakeholders and community partners. This is a three-day retreat that includes presentations by USA fellows, a keynote by the Berresford Prize recipient, and various workshops designed to provide artists care for themselves and their practices.

Anthology 
Anthology is an annual publication produced by interns at USA. Each edition highlights different themes working with each year's class of USA Fellows and provides deeper connections and understandings of them through the glimpse of their daily life. The first edition, A Slow Unfolding (2019), covers a theme of  "Nourishment" and the second edition, Grazing: A Nationwide Study of Artists and Their Snacks (2020), explores the relationship between artists and their snacks.

Artist Relief 
In order to support the life of artists during COVID-19 crisis, USA and a group of national arts grant makers have created an emergency fund to offer financial aid and useful informational resources for artist across the country. The fund will run through September 2020 in 5 rounds.

References

External links 
United States Artists website
Nicholas Tamarin, "United States Artists Awards $50,000 Grants," Interior Design
Mario Rosario Jackson, Florence Kabwasa-Green, Daniel Swenson, Joaquin Herranz, Kadija Ferryman, Caron Atlas, Eric Wallner, Carole Rosenstein: Investing in Creativity: A Study of the Support Structure for U.S. Artists. The Urban Institute, May 2, 2006. 

Fellowships
Non-profit organizations based in Chicago
Arts organizations established in 2005
2005 establishments in Illinois